Club de Fútbol Lobos de la Benemérita Universidad Autónoma de Puebla were a Mexican football club based in Puebla, Mexico. The club represented the Benemérita Universidad Autónoma de Puebla. The club's history goes back to the early 1930s when it was known as Preparatoria, formed exclusively by players who attended the university. The club has played on and off since then. It was not until the 1990s when the club made a serious comeback after playing in the lower levels of Mexican football. In 2003, the club was awarded a spot in the Primera A (now Liga de Expansión MX), where the club played until promotion in 2017 to Liga MX. The club marked its home in the Estadio Universitario BUAP.

History

Early BUAP soccer teams
The club's history dates back to 1930 when the club was known as Preparatoria, composed exclusively of players that attended the university.  It was not until 1966 when the Mexican Football Federation allowed the club to join the third division; the club played under the name Carolinos UAP, named for the university's main building that today houses the rector's office.

By 1969, Rafael Moreno Valle owned the team. He left the club to become one of the owners of Puebla FC, the other major local team in the city. Management was taken over by the university's Department of Physical Studies of Puebla. The club failed to be sustained economically and folded in 1971. The final match was placed in the Copa México, on 22 August 1971.

Lobos BUAP
In the mid-1990s, during the term of José Doger Corte as rector, Eduardo Rivera Hernández and Paul Moreno pitched the idea of buying a franchise in the Segunda División de México for the university. The brothers Adolfo and Pedro Ayala later joined the board of directors, with Ayala as the club's executive president.

It was made clear that the club should only consist of Players attending the university. The club played its first game in the Estadio Ignacio Zaragoza and was managed by a former Puebla FC player Gustavo Moscoso. Lobos was the first Second Division club ever to air its games on broadcast television, with Televisa Puebla airing twelve games. T.V on Televisa Puebla. The Mexican federation congratulated the owners board for setting a good example on how a club should be run by doing so inspired other Second Division clubs to do the same.

In its first season, the club performed poorly, but the next year, Lobos battled for a spot in the playoffs against the Águilas of the Universidad Popular Autónoma del Estado de Puebla (UPAEP), a private university in Puebla.

The club would fold three years later due to the club's poor performance; the university was unable and owners were not willing to spend more money on a club that was headed nowhere. The main economic support at the time came from a group of Engineers who decided to leave the club, leaving the university without a soccer team for almost two months.

A new rector and a new business leader, Alberto Ventosa Coghlan, quickly revived the franchise. Coghlan secured an agreement with first division club Necaxa to have Lobos as a Second Division affiliate. Mario Marin, the new mayor of Puebla City helped the club as did Leopoldo García, former director of Televisa Puebla, who would be named executive president. Despite a season in which two players, Carlos Muñoz and Emmanuel Sacramento, tied for the league lead in goals with 15, and good players including Gerardo Espinoza and Luis Gabriel Rey, who would later go on and win various championships with Atlante F.C., the new club failed to catch on, and after two seasons of poor play, Grupo Pegaso moved the team to Oaxaca.

Modern club
In 2002 Enrique Doger Guerrero, acting rector of the university, revived the club under the name Lobos de la B.U.A.P.

Managed by Evanivaldo Castro, a former Brazilian player who had played in the first division in the 1970s – 1990s, the club was admitted into the Second Division. After failing to reach the playoffs in their first season, Evanivaldo Castro was replaced by Victor Valdemar Marine for the following tournament. The team improved immensely under Marine, reaching the playoffs before being eliminated in the quarterfinals by Delfines de Coatzacoalcos. That season also saw the team move into their new home, Benito Juárez García Field, in the San Baltazar Campeche borough of Puebla. Along with a new home, the team also got increased exposure after agreeing to a deal with national cable company Megacable to have all home games broadcast locally.

In 2003 the club had a great year, winning almost all of its home games, finishing first in the south zone and qualifying to the playoffs, where they defeated Interplaya de Ciudad del Carmen and Jaguares de Villaflores. The club played the semifinal in the Estadio Cuauhtémoc against Club Deportivo Autlán who they also beat. The club would go on to win that tournament. It lost to Pachuca B in the promotion playoff game, but the team was still promoted: that same year, Salamanca was not able to pay its players and folded, which left a spot open, which was awarded to the runner-up Lobos.

In the 2009 Liga de Ascenso Apertura the club had one of its most successful campaigns to date, finishing runner up in the league with a record of 8–4–4 for a total of 28 points, just four less than Irapuato FC. In the quarterfinals the club played against Potros Neza, winning both legs. In the semifinals, Lobos fell to recently relegated Necaxa 2–0 on aggregate, with both Necaxa goals being scored in the Estadio Victoria in Aguascalientes.

In the 2010 Liga de Ascenso Bicentenario, the club just managed to qualify to the playoffs after finishing seventh in the league with a record of 7–3–6 for a total of 24 points. In the quarterfinals the club played Necaxa again. Despite a scoreless tie in the Estadio Cuauhtémoc, Necaxa won in the match in Aguascalientes on their way to another title. Necaxa would later go to win the title again and would automatically earn its promotion to the Primera División de México just a year later.

In the 2010 Liga de Ascenso Apertura, under the management of Carlos Poblete, the club managed to qualify to the quarterfinals with a record of 8–3–5. In the quarterfinals the club played against Tiburones Rojos de Veracruz; despite the two teams tying in the first match played at the Estadio Luis "Pirata" Fuente, Tiburones Rojos came out with a 1–0 win in the Estadio Cuauhtémoc to eliminate the Lobos.

With their fifth-place finish in the regular season, the 2012 Liga de Ascenso Clausura tournament saw Lobos BUAP make a final for the first time, beating Toros Neza 1–0 on aggregate with a goal scored at home and defeating Necaxa 3–1 in the semifinals. Against Club León, the Lobos tied 3–3 in Puebla but then lost 4–0 in the Estadio León.

Promotion to Liga MX
Lobos BUAP finished sixth in the 2017 Clausura tournament, earning it a playoff spot. In the quarterfinals, Lobos eliminated Alebrijes de Oaxaca with a 2–1 victory on aggregate. The semifinal round saw them defeat the Mineros de Zacatecas, which had finished with the best record in the regular season, in a resounding 6–2 victory. In the finals, they defeated Bravos de Juárez by a score of 4–1 to win their first ever league title.

In order to win promotion to the Liga MX, however, Lobos would have to face the Dorados de Sinaloa, who had won the 2016 Apertura tournament. At the Estadio Universitario BUAP, the Lobos won 1–0, and a 2–2 tie at the Estadio Banorte in Culiacán was enough to win the series and send Lobos to the Primera División for the first time.

In the 2017–18 season, Lobos BUAP played its first season in Primera División, however, the team resented its lack of experience and its low budget, so it was relegated category at the end of the season. Lobos BUAP was able to continue in the Liga MX after paying a fine of 120 million pesos (6 million dollars), this after the winner of the Ascenso MX, Cafetaleros de Chiapas, was not certified to promote.

Relocations and failed return
In June 2019, Lobos BUAP had only four players to face the 2019–20 season. On 11 June, it was announced that FC Juárez bought the Lobos BUAP franchise, taking its place in Liga MX. The Lobos board was left with the license of Juárez The university created a semi-professional squad called Cefor Lobos BUAP, which won the championship in their competition.

In June 2020, Lobos joined the newly created Liga de Balompié Mexicano after battling Liga MX in court due to corruption accusations involving the sale of the team to Juarez. In August 2020, the return was canceled due to differences between the sports project board and the BUAP board. The franchise was moved to Zacatepec and renamed as Lobos Zacatepec. However, on 10 November 2020, the team was disaffiliated by the LBM due to debts.

Season to season

 Has Played 4 3rd Division tournaments last in 1971.
 Has Played 7 2nd Division tournaments last in 2003.
 Has Played 19 Primera A tournaments last in 2013.
 After the 1971 tournament, the club folded.
 In 1996, the club reappeared, then folded in 1997.
 In 1999, the club reappeared for the third time, then folded in 2001.
 In 2002, the club reappeared a fourth time, then folded in 2019.

Stadium
The club started off playing its home games in the Estadio Cuauhtémoc in the late 1960s. By the early 1990s the club made the Estadio Ignacio Zaragoza its home. In 1999 the club had a stadium for themselves right next to the Benemérita Universidad Autónoma de Puebla with a capacity of 9,000. Due to the small stadium capacity, in 2007 the club was forced to move back to the Estadio Cuauhtémoc in order to meet the FMF Liga de Ascenso requirements, which requires a club to have a home stadium of at least 15,000.

In October 2011 it was announced that the Estadio Universitario BUAP would be finally have an expansion from 9,000 to 20,700, which is set to open in January 2012.

Official jersey

Kit evolution and rare kits
 Home kit: White shirt with a blue sash, blue shorts, and white socks.
 Away kit: Blue shirt with a white sash, blue shorts, and socks.
 Manufacturer: Pirma (2011–2019).
 Previous manufacturers: Vento (1997–2002), Lotto (2002), Pirma (2003), Cruzeiro (2004–2006), Lotto (2007–08), Kappa (2009).

Prior to 2011, the club's uniform has always been in the university colors and has varied from green, yellow, gold, and blue. In 2007, after the club joined forces with local first-division club Puebla FC, the club used a sash that runs from the right shoulder to the left.

Then in 2011, the team switched to red, black, and white as their club colors. During their final years, they wore white shirts with red and black details plus white shorts and socks as their home uniform.

Past jerseys

First kit evolution Home

First kit evolution away
First kit evolution away

Badge
The club's badge is a Wolf was taken from Melchor de Covarrubias family coats of arms. Melchor de Covarrubias helped found the university in 1587. In its early years the club used the university coats of arms which consists of a shield with a phoenix rising from the ashes. This was taken from the Melchor de Covarrubias family coats of arm. Throughout the years, the club used various badges, in the beginning using the university coat of arms.

Players

First-team squad

Reserve teams

Honours

Domestic
 Ascenso MX: (1)
Clausura 2017
Runner up: Clausura 2012

 Segunda División Profesional:
Apertura 2003

Friendlies
 Copa Ciudad Hermanas:
1969

External links

Footnotes

Football clubs in Puebla
Association football clubs established in 1999
Sport in Puebla (city)
Ascenso MX teams
1999 establishments in Mexico